Maple Island is an unincorporated community in Freeborn County, Minnesota, United States. It is located within Newry Township and Moscow Township.

The community is located east of Hollandale along State Highway 251 near Freeborn County Road 30. Other nearby places include Corning, Blooming Prairie, Geneva, and Clarks Grove.

The Chicago, Rock Island and Pacific Railroad had a station at Maple Island.

References

Unincorporated communities in Minnesota
Unincorporated communities in Freeborn County, Minnesota